Nethergate is a hamlet within the civil parish of Hindolveston  in the English county of Norfolk. The nearest railway station is at Sheringham for the Bittern Line which runs between Sheringham, Cromer and Norwich. The nearest airport is Norwich International Airport.

References

Hamlets in Norfolk
North Norfolk